Stevan Kosta Pavlowitch (7 September 1933 – 24 January 2022) was a Serbian British historian, emeritus professor of Balkan history at the University of Southampton, and a fellow of the Royal Historical Society.

Biography
Stevan Kosta Pavlowitch was born in Belgrade on 7 September 1933. His family members had a long history as diplomats in the service of Serbia's Karađorđević dynasty.

His great-grandfather Kosta Pavlović was the first mayor of Niš following its liberation from the Ottoman Turks in 1878, as well as the head of the Belgrade branch of Serbian Prime Minister Jovan Ristić's Liberal Party. Pavlowitch's grandfather, also named Stevan K. Pavlović, was an influential lawyer, interpreter and diplomat who served as an assistant to Serbia's Ministry of Foreign Affairs, governed the 77th District of Rotary International, headed the Serbian–French Friendship Society and was awarded the Legion of Honour by the French Government. He was also a member of the Yugoslav delegation at the Paris Peace Conference in 1919–1920. Pavlowitch's father Kosta St. Pavlović was a historian and writer who served as a diplomat prior to the Axis invasion of Yugoslavia in April 1941.

Pavlowitch began his schooling in Bucharest, where his father was stationed as a diplomat. Just before Yugoslavia's occupation by Germany, Italy and Hungary, Pavlowitch and his parents left the country via Nikšić airport and sought refuge in London, accompanied by Dušan Simović, Momčilo Ninčić, Miloš Trifunović, Draško Stojković, Slobodan Jovanović, and their families. Jovanović was cousins with Pavlowitch's father. Jovanović and Pavlowitch's family remained friends in exile. When Jovanović died in December 1958, he was buried on the Pavlowitch family's burial plot in London.

Exiled, Pavlowitch studied history in Paris at the Sorbonne University, in Lille and in London both at the School of Slavonic and East European Studies and King's College. From 1958 to 1965, Pavlowitch worked as a journalist and was stationed in Belgium and Italy. In 1965, he joined the staff of the University of Southampton and in 1997 became the emeritus professor of Balkan history. He was the emeritus professor of Balkan history at the University of Southampton and a fellow of the Royal Historical Society. With his research on the history of Yugoslavia, rejection of essentialist, Balkanist or Orientalist as well as predetermined or simplistic nationalists interpretations of it, over the years he became one of the most prominent international scholars of the region.

Pavlowitch was a contributor for the 1992 Radio Television of Serbia documentary series entitled Yugoslavia in War 1941–1945. He died on 24 January 2022, at the age of 88.

Bibliography

  
  
  
  
 
  
  
  
  
  
 Republished in US as :

References

1933 births
2022 deaths
British people of Serbian descent
Yugoslav emigrants to the United Kingdom
Historians of the Balkans
Academics of the University of Southampton
Fellows of the Royal Historical Society
Alumni of King's College London